The 2021 Liga 3 South Sumatra was the third season of Liga 3 South Sumatra as a qualifying round for the national round of the 2021–22 Liga 3.

Muba United were the defending champion.

Teams
There are 8 teams participated in the league this season.

First round

Group A

Group B

Second round

Finals

First leg

Second leg

References

Liga 3
Sport in South Sumatra